Wealthminder is a software company founded by CEO Rich Ellinger.

History 

Wealthminder was founded in 2012 by Saba co-founder Rich Ellinger and is headquartered in McLean, VA.

Initially started as a tool to help self-directed individual investors create a financial plan and get investment advice, Wealthminder pivoted in 2015 to providing tools and services to help individual investors and financial advisors find each other.

Wealthminder's board includes angel investor and serial entrepreneur Bobby Yazdani.

Its advisory board includes financial planner, author and founder of the Garrett Planning Network, Sheryl Garrett, as well as president of Impact Communications Marie Swift.

Services

Practice Management Software 

Wealthminder's financial planning and practice management software enables clients to enter data about their goals, existing assets, future savings and willingness to accept risk.  It then helps financial advisors create a financial plan and set of recommendations / advice for their client.  Clients have online access to their plan and both parties can monitor process against the plan.

Advisor Marketplace 

Wealthminder also provides a directory of information about financial advisors on its site to enable consumers to research and compare financial advisors.  In addition, it allows consumers to request proposals from the fee-only fiduciary advisors that participate in its network.

Investment and Finances 

Wealthminder raised a $1.45M seed round in May 2015.  Notable investors include venture capital firms Signatures Capital and Geenvisor Capital.

References 

Financial services companies of the United States